The Blown Away Tour: Live is the first DVD/live album from American country music singer Carrie Underwood. It was released on August 13, 2013.
The DVD was filmed in Ontario, California, one of the stops of Underwood's worldwide Blown Away Tour, which ran from May 26, 2012 to June 30, 2013 and played to more than a million fans across three continents and six countries. The tour was in support of her fourth studio album, Blown Away (2012).

It debuted at number one on the Top Music Videos chart in the United States, where it was later certified Gold by the Recording Industry Association of America. It also debuted at number one on the Canadian Top Music Videos chart, at number three on the Australian Music DVD Chart and number five on the UK Video Charts.

Background
The DVD was first announced on May 31, 2013, and was filmed at Underwood's concert in Ontario, California on March 3, 2013. The DVD features twenty songs, nearly 100 minutes of performance footage, behind-the-scenes clips, interviews from Underwood and the tour director Raj Kapoor, music videos, and more.

Track listing

Commercial performance
On August 19, 2013, the DVD debuted at number 5 in the UK, being Underwood's first top 5 ever in the region. It also debuted at number one on the Top Music Videos chart in the US, making Underwood the first core country artist to top the chart since 2011.
The DVD debuted at Number 3 on the Australian ARIA Music DVD chart, her highest charting position in the country.

The DVD was certified Gold by the RIAA on September 26, 2013.

Charts

Certifications

References

2013 video albums
2013 live albums
Carrie Underwood albums
Live video albums